Gas War may refer to:

Bolivian Gas War
Russia-Belarus energy dispute
Russia-Ukraine gas dispute
Gas Wars: Crony Capitalism and the Ambanis, a book by Paranjoy Guha Thakurta